The 7th Dawn is a 1964 Technicolor drama film directed by Lewis Gilbert and starring William Holden, Capucine and Tetsurō Tamba. The film, set during the Malayan Emergency, is based on the 1960 novel The Durian Tree by Michael Keon and was filmed on location in Malaysia.

Plot
1945 - As the Japanese occupiers in Malaya during World War II surrender, three friends who fought in the Resistance emerge from the jungle. Ferris is an American who fought alongside the Malayans. Dhana is a half-French, half-Vietnamese woman Ferris is in love with. Ng is a Communist revolutionary, raised by Dhana's family. They meet Trumpey, the commanding British officer, during the Japanese surrender ceremony. Ng leaves Ferris and Dhana to travel to Moscow for training. 

1953 - The Malayan communist insurgency erupts as Britain prepares to grant Malaya independence. Ferris is a prosperous rubber plantation owner. Dhana is his mistress and the head of a schoolteacher's union. Ng has returned as a committed revolutionary, commanding Communist partisans attacking British economic interests. 

Ferris's friendship with Ng has protected his rubber plantation from attack. British officials ask Ferris to convince Ng to halt his attacks until independence is granted. Ferris journeys to Ng's headquarters, but Ng does not trust the British and refuses. On his return, Ferris meets Trumpey's daughter Candace. Trumpey has returned to Malaya as High Commissioner of the United Kingdom for Malaya. Candace invites Ferris to a party at their residence, the Carcosa Seri Negara. When Ferris arrives there, Dhana is leading a protest of bicycle riders, demanding Trumpey rescind a new law, designed to prevent terrorist attacks, forbidding cyclists to ride at night. Eager to build bridges with the locals, Trumpey agrees. Ferris attends the party and sparks fly with Candace, before a terrorist bombs the event. 

Candace tries to seduce Ferris, but he rejects her. In retaliation for the bombing, Trumpey has the bomber's village, where Dhana's school is located, burned down. Dhana is horrified and tells Ng she wants to join his cause. Dhana tells Ferris she is leaving him, but he changes her mind. While riding her bike, the police stop Dhana and find explosives among her groceries. Dhana is arrested as a terrorist, tried and sentenced to death. The British offer deals to Ferris and Dhana. If either tells them the location of Ng's camp, so the British can destroy his forces and kill him, they will pardon Dhana. Dhana and Ferris both refuse to betray their old friend to save her life. 

Candace has fallen in love with Ferris and visits Dhana in prison. Dhana asks Candace to help Ferris deal with her death. Candace is moved by this selfless request and convinced Dhana is innocent. She gives herself up to Ng as a hostage, to be traded for Dhana’s life. Ferris decides the only way to save Dhana is to kill Ng. He treks into the jungle to Ng's headquarters. The British authorities give Ferris seven days to find Ng before they will execute Dhana. Candace is horrified to find she was naive. Ng is a zealot who cares more about his ideals than individual life. Candace is now a real prisoner. Ng is perfectly willing to actually kill her if Dhana is executed. 

The British learn the location of Ng's camp and attack it, just as Ferris arrives. Ng escapes with Candace. Ferris follows them through the jungle. Ferris rescues Candace and takes Ng prisoner. They trek to the coast. Ferris hopes to bring Ng to the British before Dhana's execution. Ng turns on Ferris. They fight, forcing Candace to shoot Ng. Dying, Ng reveals he planted the explosives in Dhana's bicycle. He sacrificed her, though he loved her, because he knew the death of a beloved community leader would cause protests against the British. Ferris and Candace struggle to bring Trumpey word of Ng's death, before the morning of Dhana's scheduled execution. They nearly reach their goal, but the bridge they must cross gets washed out by floods. Dhana is executed. Ferris and Candace are rescued by the British. 

Sometime later, Ferris visits Candace, who is recuperating from her ordeal in the jungle. She professes her love, but he says he is too old for her, and that he must leave Malaya. It reminds him too much of Dhana. Ferris says farewell to Candace and wishes her father good luck dealing with the Malayans, who have already begun protesting about Dhana's death.

Cast
 William Holden as Major Ferris
 Capucine as Dhana Mercier
 Tetsurō Tamba as Ng
 Susannah York as Candace Trumpey
 Michael Goodliffe as Peter Trumpey
 Allan Cuthbertson as Colonel Cavendish
 Maurice Denham as Tarlton
 Sydney Tafler as Police Commissioner Tom
 Beulah Quo as Ah Ming

Production
The Durian Tree was published in 1960. It was written by Australian journalist Michael Keon, and the lead character Ferris was an Australian. The New York Times called it "a serious and ambitious novel" but said Keon was "a good reporter but a poor novelist." The Los Angeles Times called it "suspenseful, provocative, ultimately illuminating." The film rights were bought by Charles K. Feldman.

The script included a nude scene for Susannah York, who did not want to do it, but on location the filmmakers insisted. She appeared in one take and her stand-in appeared in another. Photos of York shooting the scene were later published in Playboy magazine. York explained, "Someone had a long distance camera. I'd just like to forget about it. It's an unfortunate business."

Reception
The film generated $2.3 million in revenue and ranked 89th among American films for 1964.

Soundtrack 
The film's score was composed by Riz Ortolani following the popularity of his score for Mondo Cane that was released in the U.S. in 1963. The theme song "The Seventh Dawn" was sung by the Lettermen on the film soundtrack. Sergio Franchi recorded the song as a 1964 single and Roland Shaw provided an instrumental cover version.

References

External links
 
 
 
 

1964 films
1960s adventure drama films
1964 war films
British adventure drama films
Cold War films
The Lettermen songs
British Empire war films
Films set in Malaysia
Films based on Australian novels
Films directed by Lewis Gilbert
British war drama films
United Artists films
Films scored by Riz Ortolani
1964 drama films
American World War II films
British World War II films
Films about the Malayan Emergency
1960s English-language films
1960s American films
1960s British films